The Gallery Soulflower is an art gallery in Thailand created and managed by Soulflower and founded by Amit Sarda and Natasha Tuli. Since 2007 they have been promoting Indian art and it serves as a platform for Indian contemporary artists to present their individual art. The gallery is housed within the Silom Galleria and organizes 4-6 exhibitions annually, by established and emerging Indian artists from all over the country, as well as foreign artists. Works on display range from painting, sculpture, photography, installations, to new media and conceptual-based art.

Some of the artists who have displayed their work
include: Yashwant Deshmukh, B M Kamath, Pooja Iranna, Chintan upadhyay, Vivek Vilasini, Murali Cheeroth, Navin Rawanchaikul, Ranbir Kaleka, Maya Burman, Lavanya Mani, Shefali Nayan, Varunika Saraf, Prajakta Potnis Ponmany, Rirkrit Tiravanija, Viraj Naik, Azis T M, Zakkir Hussain, K P Reji, E H Pushkin, Binoy Varghese, Gigi Scaria, Babu Xavier, Sheba Chhachhi and others.

References

External links
Official Website
Gallery Soulflower

Art museums and galleries in Thailand
Culture of Bangkok